During the 2013–14 season Vitesse Arnhem participated in the Dutch Eredivisie, the KNVB Cup, and the UEFA Europa League.

Events
On 18 May, manager Fred Rutten opted to not take up the contract renewal, and left the club. On 7 June, the club scheduled a friendly against Standard Liège, which will be played on 14 July. Six days later, the club announced a friendly with Lierse SK, scheduled to be played on 19 July.

On 14 June, Bayer Leverkusen is announced as the club's opponent on 27 July. The match will also be played at GelreDome.

On 19 June, Peter Bosz is announced as new manager. Late in the month, Vitesse announced Marko Vejinović as the first summer signing.

Players

Squad details

Transfers

In

Total spending:  €0

Out

Total gaining:  €23,200,000 (£20,000,000)

Competition

Eredivisie

League table

Matches

KNVB Cup

UEFA Europa League

Third qualifying round

European competition play-offs

First round

Friendlies

Pre-season

Winter

References

External links 
Vitesse Official Website 
UEFA Website

Dutch football clubs 2013–14 season
2013–14 UEFA Europa League participants seasons
SBV Vitesse seasons